The murder of Kristopher "Kris" Kime was the killing of a 20-year-old Auburn, Washington resident and Highline Community College (Des Moines, Washington) student when he was knocked down and beaten to death during the Seattle Mardi Gras Riots that occurred in Seattle's Pioneer Square district early in the morning of February 28, 2001.

Kime was bending over to help a young woman who was lying on the ground and being attacked.  As he bent over, he was struck on the back of his head by Jerell Thomas.  He fell onto the pavement and struck his head again.  As he lay there, other rioters began to kick him.  His friends and others surrounded him to protect him.

As he lay dying in the streets, police officers stood on the sidelines and watched.  His friends ran to the police and asked for assistance.  The police were instructed they could not enter the riot zone,  so they did not intervene.  Off-duty fire department workers and his friends carried Kris out of the zone onto a nearby street.  He was placed in a police vehicle,  driven to Harborview Medical Center, and placed on life support. He died later the following night.  The cause of death was listed as resulting from a fractured skull and subdural hematoma.

Kris Kime's mother, Kimberly Kime-Parks, blasted the Seattle Police Department for letting the riots escalate out of control. "I always thought police were there to protect and serve, but they weren't there to protect and serve my son," she said. Other people questioned why police didn't act sooner.

In the wake of the riots, Mayor Paul Schell announced a moratorium on Mardi Gras celebrations in Seattle.

Kime's family filed a lawsuit against the City of Seattle, claiming that the City enhanced the danger to citizens.  The claim was based on the City's instructions that officers should stand by and not intervene.  The lawsuit claimed this empowered and emboldened lawlessness as gang members and others brutalized innocent revelers.  When the case settled, the family received $1,750,000 from the City, and annuity payments which would be used to set up a scholarship in Kris Kime's name.  In addition a bronze plaque was placed in Pioneer Square in memorial to Kris's life.

The attacker was identified by police as 17-year-old Jerell Thomas. He was convicted of second-degree murder in 2001.  The conviction was overturned by the Washington State Court of Appeals. The appeal was based on a prior state Supreme Court decision ruling that an assault leading to death cannot be murder without intent to kill. In 2006, Thomas was retried and pleaded guilty to the lesser charge of second-degree manslaughter, receiving a 10-year jail sentence.  However, due to previous time served and good behavior, according to his lawyer, Jeff Kradel, Thomas could be out of prison by late 2008.  Jerell Thomas was released from prison in December 2009.

A CBS News story in March 2006 reported that Kime's organs had been made available for donation after his death.  Five recipients received organ transplants.  The five recipients of Kime's organs were invited to the wedding of Kime's sister, Kirsten, which was held May 2006.

References 

2001 murders in the United States
People from Auburn, Washington
2001 in Washington (state)
People murdered in Washington (state)
Murdered American students
February 2001 events in the United States
2000s in Seattle